The Dowris Hoard is the name of an important Bronze Age hoard of over 200 objects found in Dowris, County Offaly, Ireland. Items from the deposit are currently split between two institutions: the National Museum of Ireland in Dublin and the British Museum in London.

The hoard mostly of objects in bronze, was probably a ritual deposit, perhaps for religious purposes, though the records of the discovery, by farm labourers in the 1820s, do not allow to be sure if it was one deposit, or a series.  Current thinking tends to see it as a series, possibly over a very long period, of ritual deposits into a lake.

The importance of the hoard in Irish prehistory has led to the naming of the final phase of the Irish Late Bronze Age (900–600 BC) as the Dowris Phase or period. Over time Irish prehistoric bronzesmiths had become highly adept at casting and working with sheet metal and the Dowris Phase reflects the culmination of this as well as an industrial growth in metalworking.  During this period ironworking was already found on the European Continent, in Halstatt culture "C", and arrived in Britain, but did not reach Ireland. Until the culture was apparently disrupted around 600 BC, gold jewellery of superb quality was produced, as well as weapons, tools, trumpets and other kinds of objects in bronze, of which the Dowris Hoard has an exceptional selection.

Discovery

The Dowris Hoard was accidentally discovered in the 1820s by two men digging trenches for potatoes on a peat bog near the shores of Lough Coura. During the Bronze Age, the area was covered by a shallow lake, which later silted up in the late Middle Ages. Dowris (also known as Doorosheath or Duros) is located near the village of Whigsborough, northeast of Birr in County Offaly, Ireland. The hoard subsequently came into the possession of William Parsons, 3rd Earl of Rosse and TD Cooke. The latter sold his collection of Irish antiquities to the British Museum in 1854.

Description
One of the largest Bronze Age assemblage of artefacts ever found in Ireland, the Dowris Hoard originally comprised more than 200 pieces, of which 111 are currently in the collections of the  National Museum of Ireland and 79 in the British Museum. In total, the hoard includes:

44 spearheads
48 crotals (a musical instrument in the form of a rattle)
43 socketed axes
26 bronze horns or trumpets 
5 swords (approx 48 cm long, possibly originating from the south of England)
A riveted bronze cauldron
Three buckets or situlae 
Numerous tools including chisels and knives.

The hoard contains all but two of the Bronze Age crotals (Greek 'crotalon' – castanet or rattle) ever found, the other two also being Irish (but see also crotal bell for later types).  These are bronze cylinders in the rough shape of a bull's testicle, with a piece of baked clay or a pebble inside. It is presumed they functioned as a type of rattle, perhaps "in the rites of a fertility cult associated with the bull, echoes of which may survive in the early medieval tale Táin Bó Cúailnge (The Cattle Raid of Cooley)".  The hoard had 48 of them in total, in two sizes.

See also
Mooghaun North Hoard
Broighter Treasure

Notes

References
G. Eogan: The Hoards of the Irish later Bronze Age. Dublin, 1983; pp. 69–73.
Wallace, Patrick F., O'Floinn, Raghnall, eds. Treasures of the National Museum of Ireland: Irish Antiquities, Dublin: Gill & Macmillan, 2003 

Prehistoric Ireland
Prehistoric objects in the British Museum
Treasure troves in the Republic of Ireland
Bronze Age art
Collection of the National Museum of Ireland
Ancient art in metal